The Egyetemi Bajnokság (University Championships) is a rugby competition played in Hungary.

Format and structure
Six teams take part in six circuit tournaments.

Current teams
2009–10 season

Notes and references

External links
Egyetemi Bajnokság

See also
Rugby union in Hungary

Rugby union competitions in Hungary
University and college rugby union competitions